Andrew Vladislav Goldberg (born 1960) is an American computer scientist working primarily on design, analysis, and experimental evaluation of algorithms. He also worked on mechanism design, computer systems, and complexity theory. Currently he is a Senior Principal Scientist at Amazon.com.

Education and career
Goldberg did his undergraduate studies at the Massachusetts Institute of Technology, graduating in 1982. After earning a master's degree at the University of California, Berkeley, he returned to MIT with funding from a prestigious Hertz Fellowship, finishing his doctorate there in 1987 with a thesis on the Efficient graph algorithms for sequential and parallel computers supervised by Charles E. Leiserson.

Career and research
After completing his PhD, Goldberg was on the faculty of Stanford University and worked for NEC Research Institute, Intertrust STAR Laboratories, and Microsoft Research Silicon Valley Lab. He joined Amazon.com in 2014.

Goldberg is best known for his research in the design and analysis of algorithms for graphs and networks, and particularly for his work on the maximum flow problem and shortest path problem, including the discovery of the push–relabel maximum flow algorithm. He also worked on algorithmic game theory, where he was one of the first scientists to study worst-case mechanism design.

Selected publications

Awards and honors
Goldberg holds a number of awards, including a Hertz Fellowship in 1985, the 1988 A.W. Tucker Prize of the Mathematical Optimization Society, 1988 National Science Foundation (NSF) Presidential Young Investigator Award, 1991 ONR Young Investigator Award, and 2011 INFORMS Optimization Society Farkas Prize. In 2012–2013, Goldberg was a Founding Faculty Fellow of the Skolkovo Institute of Science and Technology.

Goldberg was nominated a Fellow of the Association for Computing Machinery (ACM) in 2009 "for contributions to fundamental theoretical and practical problems in the design and analysis of algorithms." In 2013, he became a fellow of the Society for Industrial and Applied Mathematics.

References

1960 births
Living people
American computer scientists
Russian computer scientists
Massachusetts Institute of Technology alumni
Place of birth missing (living people)
University of California, Berkeley alumni
Stanford University faculty
Fellows of the Society for Industrial and Applied Mathematics
Fellows of the Association for Computing Machinery